Dunbaritidae is one of six families of the Somoholitoidea superfamily. They are an extinct group of ammonoid, which are shelled cephalopods related to squids, belemnites, octopuses, and cuttlefish, and more distantly to the nautiloids.

References

 Dunbaritidae in the Paleobiology Database and Dunbaritidae at Fossilworks, accessed on 1 October 2007

Goniatitida families
Somoholitaceae